Wings for this Man is a propaganda film produced in 1945 by the U.S. Army Air Forces First Motion Picture Unit about the Tuskegee Airmen, the first unit of African-American pilots in the US military formed during World War II.

The film begins with dramatic footage of aerial combat over Italy, showing an outnumbered American squadron successfully dogfighting a Luftwaffe formation. When the pilots land they step out and are revealed to be black.

The picture then tells the story of the Tuskegee Airmen, starting with the Tuskegee Institute in Alabama and the founding of the airstrip near it. The narrator, future President Ronald Reagan, notes that the airmen had to overcome exceeding odds to get the unit created and notes that "there was  misunderstanding, distrust and prejudice that had to be cleared away" before the unit could form. A rather standard training/combat/casualty sequence then follows, culminating in the third anniversary celebration of the unit followed by a parade.

See also 
 List of Allied propaganda films of World War II
 Ronald Reagan films

External links 
 
 
 

1945 films
United States government films
American short documentary films
American World War II propaganda shorts
African-American history of the United States military
Documentary films about military aviation
Tuskegee Airmen
First Motion Picture Unit films
Documentary films about African Americans
Articles containing video clips
American black-and-white films
1940s short documentary films
1940s American films